The Masque of the Red Death was a 1989 film directed by Alan Birkinshaw, starring Frank Stallone, Brenda Vaccaro and Herbert Lom, produced by Avi Lerner and Harry Alan Towers for Menahem Golan's 21st Century Film Corporation, from a script by Michael J. Murray. It was one of two otherwise unrelated films with the same title released that year.

The film is a slasher movie set in the 1980s, with little to do with Poe's work other than being set at a costume party themed after Poe's short story of the same name, and a reference to "The Pit and the Pendulum". In Touchstones of Gothic Horror, David Huckvale states that the film may have been influenced by the short story "Duke of Portland" by Auguste de Villiers de L'Isle-Adam.

References 

1980s English-language films